In British politics, a rosette is a fabric decoration worn by political candidates to identify themselves as belonging to a particular party. The rosette, worn on the chest or suit jacket, will show the colour or colours of the political party that the candidate represents.

Standard colours and emblems
The most commonly seen colours of rosettes are:

 Red for Labour 
 Blue for Conservative 
 Amber for Liberal Democrats 
 Green for Green Party 
 Yellow for SNP 
 Red, white and blue for DUP 
 Green and orange for Plaid Cymru 
 Light blue for Reform UK 
 Purple for UK Independence Party 
 White for Yorkshire Party 

In similar fashion, candidates wearing suits to their election counts will often wear a tie of their party's corresponding colour. Coloured flowers are also sometimes used, particularly in the case of the red rose as a symbol of the Labour Party; this has been common since the 1980s when leaders Neil Kinnock and Tony Blair encouraged their use, and Labour adopted the red rose as the party's logo.

Monster Raving Loony Party candidates may satirise the practice by wearing oversized rosettes of various colours.

History
When political parties emerged in the UK, they used different colours in different areas. This may have been for a variety of reasons, such as association of colours with leading families of the area and then the political parties they supported. In some areas, non-standard colours were worn up to around the 1970s as a local tradition. Major political parties have now standardised on the colours used nationally, a trend accelerated by the arrival of colour television.

The wearing of rosettes in polling stations is strictly regulated by the Electoral Commission; the only people allowed to wear them are candidates and their election agents, and those worn must not bear either the candidate's name or a political slogan. In 2008, the Commission also stipulated that rosettes greater than four inches in diameter were not allowed to be worn in polling stations.

In Labour and Conservative safe seats, a common saying is that a pig or monkey in a red or blue rosette would win an election in that seat.

See also
 Cockade
 Political uniform
 List of political party symbols

References

Political terminology
Political symbols